Pipemakers Park is located in the inner western suburbs of Melbourne in the city of Maribyrnong, on the western bank of the Maribyrnong River near Highpoint Shopping Centre. The park was created on the site of a former pipe works and meat preserving company, and retains historic buildings adapted to a museum (Melbourne's Living Museum of the West). and interpreted industrial ruins.

The park was formerly managed by Parks Victoria but in 2014, Maribyrnong City Council took over management of this and the adjacent Burndap Park and Frog Hollow.

History

Joseph Raleigh established a boiling down works on the banks of the river in the 1840s. the buildings were adapted to the Melbourne Meat Preserving Company works in 1868, and then taken over by Humes Pipe in about 1911. In the 1980s the Melbourne & Metropolitan Board of Works purchased the site and developed it as parkland and home to the Living Museum, opening in 1984.

Geography
The park sits on the floodplain of the Maribyrnong river below a steep escarpment of the western basalt plains.

References

Heritage sites in Melbourne
Parks in Melbourne
City of Maribyrnong